The Vidarbha Kingdom in the Sanskrit epic Mahabharata is among the many kingdoms ruled by Yadu kings (Bhoja Yadavas).
It was situated in the region still known as Vidarbha in what is now Maharashtra in the Deccan.

Damayanti, the wife of Nala was the princess of Vidarbha. Similarly Rukmini, the eldest wife of Vasudeva Krishna was from Vidarbha. Sage Agastya's wife Lopamudra, also was a princess from the country of Vidarbha as mentioned in the Mahabharata. Indumati, the Grandmother of Lord Rama and mother of King Dasharatha  was also a princess of Vidarbha kingdom. Kundinapuri was its capital, which is identified as Kaundinyapur in the eastern Maharashtra.  Rukmini's brother Rukmi founded another kingdom with capital Bhojakata, close to Vidarbha proper.  During the Kurukshetra War, when all other kingdoms participated in the battle, Vidarbha under Rukmi stayed neutral, because his army was rejected by both Pandavas and Kauravas who were the two parties engaged in the war.  It is not clear if any other king from Vidarbha participated in the war.  There is a mention at MBh 6:51, that a Vidarbha army sided with Kauravas under the generalissimo Bhishma.

King Bhima of Vidarbha 

King Bhima is mentioned as the ancient ruler of Vidarbha at many places in Mahabharata.  (MBh 3:53 to 77).  The

The southern route connecting Vidarbha and Ayodhya 

Mahabharata gives clues on a route that existed in ancient times connecting Vidarbha to the northern kingdoms like Kosala.

The following conversation between Nala and Damayanti describes many ancient roads or pathways connecting kingdoms of north, south and central India of ancient times. (MBh 3:61)

These many roads lead to the southern country, passing by (the city of) Avanti and the Rikshavat mountains. This is that mighty mountain called Vindhya; yon, the river Payasvini running seawards, and yonder are the asylums of the ascetics, furnished with various fruit and roots.  This road leadeth to the country of the Vidarbhas—and that, to the country of the Kosalas. Beyond these roads to the south is the southern country.

Rituparna, the king (of Ayodhya, Kosala), arrived at the city of the Vidarbhas. The people brought unto king Bhima (of Vidarbha) the tidings (of his arrival). And at the invitation of Bhima, the king entered the city of Kundina

The king of Kosala reflected a while and at length said, ‘I have come here to pay my respects to thee.’ And the king Bhima was struck with astonishment, and reflected upon the (probable) cause of Rituparna's coming, having passed over a hundred yojanas. And he reflected, ‘That passing by other sovereigns, and leaving behind him innumerable countries, he should come simply to pay his respect to me is scarcely the reason of his arrival.

Bhojas of Goa
Bhojas of Goa who ruled Goa and parts of Konkan and some part of Karnataka from at least 3rd century AD to the 6th century AD are believed to have descended from the Bhojas of Vidarbha who migrated southwards and founded a kingdom in South Konkan(Goa). Goa came under the political sway of the Bhojas who ruled this territory in feudal allegiance to the emperor of Pataliputra or perhaps under Shatavahanas. The Bhoja seat of power was located at Chandrapura or Chandraura (Modern Chandor) in Goa.

Other References 
A Vidarbha princess Susrava is mentioned at MBh 1:95. She was wedded to a prince named Jayatsena, of the Lunar Dynasty. Avachina was her son.
Ikshwaku King Sagara is mentioned to have a Vidarbha princess
Sage Agastya is mentioned to have a Vidrabha princess as his wife.
  A river named Payoshni is mentioned to be flowing through this kingdom. Its fine landing place was constructed by the king of Vidarbha. (MBh 3:120).

See also
Bhojas of Goa

References 

Kisari Mohan Ganguli, The Mahabharata of Krishna-Dwaipayana Vyasa Translated into English Prose, 1883-1896.

Rukhmini Udana: The Flight to sri Krishna Reunion by Dr Hemant Bonde Patil Atlantic publishers & Distributors, India,

External links

Kingdoms in the Mahabharata
Vidarbha
History of Maharashtra
History of Nagpur
History of Vidarbha